Doues is a town and comune in the Aosta Valley region of north-western Italy.

Cities and towns in Aosta Valley